Wei County or Weixian is a county in the south of Hebei province, China. It is served by G45 Daqing–Guangzhou Expressway and China National Highway 106.

Administrative divisions
Wei County consists of 5 towns and 11 townships.

Towns:

Mingzhou
Liyuantun
Zhangtai
Houguan
Qiji

Townships:

Fangjiaying Township
Dishiying Township
Zaoyuan Township
Guxian Township
Hezhao Township
Heying Township
Zhangying Township
Changtun Township
Changzhuang Township
Gaogongzhuang Township
Zhaocun Township

Climate

References

County-level divisions of Hebei
Xingtai